Precision bias also known as numeracy bias is a form of cognitive bias in which an evaluator of information commits a logical fallacy as the result of confusing accuracy and precision. More particularly, in assessing the merits of an argument, a measurement, or a report, an observer or assessor falls prey to precision bias when they believe that greater precision implies greater accuracy (i.e., that simply because a statement is precise, it is also true); the observer or assessor are said to provide false precision.

The clustering illusion and the Texas sharpshooter fallacy may both be treated as relatives of precision bias. In these related fallacies, precision is mistakenly considered evidence of causation, when in fact the clustered information may actually be the result of randomness.

See also
Accuracy and precision

External links
 Truth Versus Precision In Economics, Thomas Mayer, Emeritus Professor of Economics, University of California
 "Less Is More: Accuracy vs. Precision In Modeling", Susan Bachman et al. ("Many modelers assume that building with more precision yields a more accurate model.")

References

Cognitive biases
Psychology